James Cooper (born January 5, 1964) is an American law enforcement officer and politician who served in the California State Assembly. He is a Democrat who represented the 9th Assembly District, which encompassed portions of Sacramento and San Joaquin Counties.

Cooper was a member of the California Legislative Black Caucus and Assistant Majority Floor Leader. Prior to being elected to the Assembly in 2014, he was an Elk Grove Founding Mayor and 15-year City Councilmember and 30-year Sacramento County Sheriff's Captain.

On March 3, 2022, Cooper was stopped by TSA officers at the Sacramento airport for having a loaded gun in his purse. Cooper was sworn in as the sheriff of Sacramento County, California on December 16, 2022.

Political positions 
Cooper has been graded an “F” by the California Rifle and Pistol Association for his positions associated with the Second Amendment.

Cooper has also been described as a "crusader against criminal justice reform". Examples of this include his opposition to Proposition 47 and support for Proposition 20.

Cooper is opposed to fossil fuel divestment and played a key role in halting the progression of SB 1173, a bill that would have forced CalPERS and CalSTRS to divest from most fossil fuel holdings.

Sacramento County Sheriff 2010
Cooper unsuccessfully ran for Sheriff of Sacramento County, California in 2010 and lost against Scott Jones.  Before running, he had a thirty-year career in various positions at the Sheriff's office.

California State Assembly 2014-2022

2022 Sacramento County Sheriff 
On March 15, 2022, Cooper announced that he would be a candidate for Sacramento County Sheriff. In the election, he defeated his opponent, undersheriff Jim Barnes with 54.48% of the vote.

References

External links 
 
 Campaign website
 AB 1681
 Join California Jim Cooper
 

Democratic Party members of the California State Assembly
1964 births
Living people
People from Elk Grove, California
California city council members
African-American state legislators in California
21st-century American politicians
21st-century African-American politicians
20th-century African-American people